The 2017 Asia Rugby Sevens Series is the ninth edition of Asia's continental sevens tournament. The lower-tier Trophy tournament hosted in Qatar served as a qualifier, with the top team qualifying for the main series hosted in Hong Kong, South Korea, and Sri Lanka.

The top two teams that are not already core teams on the Sevens World Series will earn qualification to the 2018 Hong Kong Sevens for a chance to earn core team status for the following World Series.

In addition, the 2017 edition of the Asian series serves as qualification to the 2018 Rugby World Cup Sevens, with the top two teams qualifying.

Teams 

Asia Rugby Sevens Trophy

 
 
 
 
 
 
 
 
 
 
 

Asia Rugby Sevens Series

Trophy
The men's Trophy was held 3–4 March at Aspire Rugby Football Centre, Doha, Qatar.

Group stage 

Pool A

Pool B

Pool C

Pool D

Knockout stage 

9th-11th Place

5th-8th Place

Cup

Final standings

Main series

Hong Kong 
Was held 1–2 September. All matches were held at King's Park Sports Ground. All times are Hong Kong Time (UTC+8).

Pool A

Pool B

Cup

Plate

Sri Lanka
Will be held 14–15 October. All matches will be held at Racecourse International Rugby Stadium in Colombo. All times are Sri Lanka Standard Time(UTC+5:30).

Pool A

Pool B

Cup

Plate

Final standings

See also
 2018 Rugby World Cup Sevens qualifying – Men
 2017 Asia Rugby Women's Sevens Series

References

2017
2017 rugby sevens competitions
2017 in Asian rugby union
International rugby union competitions hosted by Qatar
International rugby union competitions hosted by Hong Kong
International rugby union competitions hosted by South Korea
International rugby union competitions hosted by Sri Lanka
rugby union
rugby union
rugby union
rugby union
Sri Lanka Sevens